Aidyn Smagulov (born December 1, 1976) is a Kyrgyz and Kazakh judoka. He won the Kazakhstan championship in 1996 and went on to win the bronze medal at the 2000 Summer Olympics in the men's extra lightweight (– 60 kg) category, together with Cuba's Manolo Poulot. He is the first Olympic medalist to represent Kyrgyzstan in the nation's history.

An ethnic Kazakh, Smagulov was born and trained in Kazakhstan. He has represented Kyrgyzstan since 1999.

References
 Videos of Aidyn Smagulov in action (judovision.org)

External links
 
 

1976 births
Living people
Kazakhstani male judoka
Kyrgyzstani male judoka
Judoka at the 2000 Summer Olympics
Olympic judoka of Kyrgyzstan
Olympic bronze medalists for Kyrgyzstan
Olympic medalists in judo
Judoka at the 2002 Asian Games
Medalists at the 2000 Summer Olympics
Asian Games competitors for Kazakhstan
20th-century Kyrgyzstani people
20th-century Kazakhstani people